The Bund Chilenischer Burschenschaften is a confederation of German-Chilean student associations founded in 1966. The Burschenschaften are a form of student society founded in Germany in 1815.

In Chile the Burschenschaften began in 1866 with the foundation of the Burschenschaft Araucania in Santiago.  The German professor Max Westenhofer describes in his memoirs the student associations of the descendants of the Germans that were maintained at the beginning of the century.  A Burschenschaft brings together students and university graduates who preserve the German culture and language, the vast majority are ethnic Germans of Chilean nationality.  Today there are five Chilean Burschenschaften:

Santiago: Burschenschaft Araucania and Burschenschaft Andinia
Concepción: Burschenschaft Montania
Valparaíso: Burschenschaft Ripuaria
Valdivia: Burschenschaft Vulkania

References
This article contains material translated from the Spanish Wikipedia.

Student organizations established in 1966
1966 establishments in Chile
German-Chilean culture